Qarloq (also Romanized as Qārloq; also known as Gharlogh, Qārlūq, and Qarlūq) is a village in Kuhpayeh Rural District, Nowbaran District, Saveh County, Markazi Province, Iran. At the 2006 census, its population was 143, in 57 families.

References 

Populated places in Saveh County